The eighth series of British talent competition programme Britain's Got Talent was broadcast on ITV, from 12 April to 7 June 2014; because of England's international friendly with Peru, the show took a break on 30 May to avoid clashing with live coverage of the match. Auditions were held in Northern Ireland instead of Scotland for this series, with hosts Anthony McPartlin and Declan Donnelly (colloquially known as Ant & Dec) having to stand in for Simon Cowell, after illness forced him to be absent during a day of auditions. This series was the first in the programme's history to introduce the "Golden Buzzer" format to the competition  an element that was being introduced to the Got Talent franchise since it was first introduced on Germany's Got Talent in 2012.

The eighth series was won by boy band Collabro and finishing in first place and opera singer Lucy Kay finishing in second place. During its broadcast, the series averaged around 9.8 million viewers.

Series overview

Following open auditions held the previous year between 19 October to 1 December 2013 in various cities, which included auditions held at a series of "Talent Spot tents" provided by the show's sponsor that year, and at The Savoy Hotel in Blackpool and The Old Ship Hotel in Brighton, the Judges' auditions took place between January and February 2014, within Belfast, London, Manchester, Birmingham, and Cardiff. For the first time since the first series, auditions didn't take place in Scotland, as the show's producers wished to try new locations for talent, which led to them opting to hold auditions within Northern Ireland for the first time as a result. Due to illness, Simon Cowell was forced to be absent from a day of auditions in Manchester to recover, leading to hosts Ant & Dec each standing in for him, while on the final day of auditions in London, Cowell was forced to be absent for them to attend to his girlfriend Lauren Silverman, who had gone into labour that day; the show's production team chose not to bring in a stand-in because of this.

By the time that the public auditions for the eighth series' competition had begun, the Got Talent franchise was beginning to update its format for auditions across international editions through the inclusion of a new feature the "Golden Buzzer". First introduced on Germany's Got Talent, the new format meant that those auditioning for a place in the live rounds of the competition for this year could earn an automatic place in the live rounds from any of the judges or the hosts, regardless of the opinions about their performance. Although the judges and hosts had permission to use the buzzer, Stephen Mulhern was not allowed to use it, despite his involvement in overseeing auditions for Britain's Got More Talent.

Of the participants that took part, forty-five made it past this stage and into the five live semi-finals- amongst these, salsa dancing duo Paddy & Nico, hip hop duo Bars & Melody, singer Christian Spridon, girl group REAformed, and stand-up comedian/impressionist Toju, each received a golden buzzer during their auditions (by Holden, Cowell, Walliams, Dixon and Ant & Dec respectively) with nine appearing in each one, and eleven of these acts making it into the live final; the wildcard act chosen by the judges was impressionist Jon Clegg, after he lost out in the tied Judges' vote in the first semi-final. The following below lists the results of each participant's overall performance in this series:

 |  |  | 
 Judges' Wildcard Finalist |  Golden Buzzer Audition

  Ages denoted for a participant(s), pertain to their final performance for this series.
  No information on the puppeteer for this act was disclosed by the show.

Semi-finals summary
 Buzzed out |  Judges' vote | 
 |  |

Semi-final 1 (26 May)
Guest Performer, Results Show: Ella Henderson

  Jon Clegg was later sent through to the final as the judges wildcard.

Semi-final 2 (27 May)
Guest Performer, Results Show: Ed Sheeran

  For health and safety reasons, Bolddog FMX Team's performance was pre-recorded outside the studio in advance.

Semi-final 3 (28 May)
Guest Performers, Results Show: The Vamps

Semi-final 4 (29 May)
Guest Performers, Results Show: will.i.am & Cody Wise

Semi-final 5 (31 May)
Guest Performers, Results Show: Attraction, and Richard & Adam

  Paddy & Nico's performance had to be slightly modified before the semi-final, after the former was injured before its broadcast.

Final (7 June)
Guest Performers, Results Show: Diversity & Little Mix, and Cheryl Cole (featuring Tinie Tempah)

 |

Ratings

References

2014 British television seasons
Britain's Got Talent